Euagoras is a genus of assassin bugs (insects in the family Reduviidae), in the subfamily Harpactorinae.  Species are found in Asia and Australia.

Species
The Global Biodiversity Information Facility lists:
 Euagoras ambesus Miller, 1941
 Euagoras annulatus Horváth, 1919
 Euagoras asseda Stål, 1863
 Euagoras atripes Stål, 1863
 Euagoras bispinosus (Fabricius, 1803)
 Euagoras buruensis Miller, 1954
 Euagoras crockeri Van Duzee, 1940
 Euagoras dolosus Stål, 1863
 Euagoras dorycus (Boisduval, 1835)
 Euagoras elegans Miller, 1948
 Euagoras erythrocephala Livingstone & Ravichandran, 1990
 Euagoras fuscipinus (Stål, 1859)
 Euagoras geniculatus Breddin, 1859
 Euagoras insipidus (Signoret, 1860)
 Euagoras intermedius Miller, 1941
 Euagoras limbatus Breddin, 1899
 Euagoras pallescens Herrich-Schaeffer, 1850
 Euagoras plagiatus (Burmeister, 1834)
 Euagoras sordidatus Stål, 1866
 Euagoras stollii Burmeister, 1835
 Euagoras subunicolor (Breddin, 1901)
 Euagoras tagalicus Stål, 1870

References

Reduviidae
Cimicomorpha genera